Melinda Sullivan (born September 30, 1987) is an American dancer, choreographer and actress. She is known for her work on the U.S. version of So You Think You Can Dance, where she was a finalist in the television series' seventh season, and as the 2012 winner of the Capezio A.C.E. Award. That entry, "Gone", debuted in expanded form in New York in August 2013.

Background, career

Born in East Meadow, New York, and raised in Thousand Oaks, California, Sullivan began tap dancing at a studio at age four, turning professional at age 14. "As a young girl, I found the freedom to be loud. To be brash. To be different than my family. Tap dancing allows me to express my artistic side, my creative side, my funny side, my rebellious side." Her mentors included Jason Samuels Smith and Chloe Arnold. As a high school senior, she won a role in the Cats 25th anniversary touring company, followed by the inaugural national tour of High School Musical on Stage!.

In 2009, she played Zoe Finn in the American soap opera As the World Turns. The following year, she finished 9th place in the seventh season of the U.S. version of So You Think You Can Dance; it was the furthest any tap dancer had gone on the show until fellow tap contestant Aaron Turner finally topped her record in Season 10. In 2011, Sullivan toured with Jason Samuels Smith's A.C.G.I. troupe, which blended an improvisational style with traditional dance choreography. In 2016, she danced in the film La La Land''''s opening number, "Another Day of Sun", which was shot at the interchange of the Interstate 105 and 110 freeways.

In December 2017, she was one of a quartet of female dancers in Michelle Dorrance's Until the Real Thing Comes Along (a letter to ourselves), which debuted at New York's Joyce Theater. New York Times dance critic Gia Kourlas called Dorrance's collaborators—Sullivan, Jillian Meyers, and Josette Wiggan-Freund—"three singular and rhythmically brilliant dancers who are part of the traditional tap scene, but who also live in the commercial world."

Choreography

In 2012, Sullivan's dancing and choreography on her work "Gone" won Dance Teacher magazine's Capezio A.C.E. Award and its $15,000 production budget to create a show in New York. "In weathered boots and dresses that could have crossed the plains in a covered wagon, six tap dancers not only drill it down with their feet, they use their full bodies to convey loss and grief", wrote Dance Magazine. "'Gone' is a moody work that blends the drama of modern dance with the heart-pumping thrill of rhythm tap." The magazine named her among the "25 to Watch" for 2013.

An expanded version, Gone: A Sound and Theater Project, debuted at New York's Ailey Citigroup Theater on August 5, 2013, with a new score by Nikos Syropoulos. New York Times'' dance critic Brian Seibert noted Sullivan's aim of bridging two schools of tap dancing, rooted respectively in jazz and musical theater, and called it "a worthy goal" of admirable ambition, but felt that the story didn't cohere and the choreography was uneven. He called Sullivan's depiction of her grandmother as a young woman and a flashback set in Central Park "the work’s best scene. Here Ms. Sullivan, with a sly smile and a sense of wonder, is at her most engaging, and her choreography—setting the romantic duet amid interference by her six-member female ensemble—captures some of the playful joy of the musical-theater tradition." Seibert concluded that "what Ms. Sullivan is trying is very hard. The flaws of 'Gone' are no reason she shouldn't keep going."

Work

External links

 Official site
 New York Times slide show: ''Melinda Sullivan's 'Gone'''
 USA Today video: dance moves from La La Land

References
 

1987 births
21st-century American actresses
Actresses from California
Actresses from New York (state)
American choreographers
American female dancers
American musical theatre actresses
American people of Irish descent
American soap opera actresses
American stage actresses
American tap dancers
American women choreographers
Dancers from California
Dancers from New York (state)
Living people
People from East Meadow, New York
People from Thousand Oaks, California
So You Think You Can Dance (American TV series) contestants